HMS Portland was a 50-gun fourth rate ship of the line of the Royal Navy, built at Limehouse according to the dimensions laid down in the 1741 proposals of the 1719 Establishment, and launched on 11 October 1744.

Portland served until 1763, when she was sold out of the navy.

Notes

References

Lavery, Brian (2003) The Ship of the Line - Volume 1: The development of the battlefleet 1650-1850. Conway Maritime Press. .

Ships of the line of the Royal Navy
1744 ships